Linda S. Goldberg is an Economist at the Federal Reserve Bank of New York and is currently Senior Vice President in the Research Policy Leadership division. She holds a Ph.D. and M.A. from Princeton University and a B.A. in Mathematics and Economics from the City University of New York.

She is a Faculty Research Fellow at the NBER. Goldberg is a co-director of the International Banking Research Network (IBRN) and an officer at the Central Banking Economic Research Association. She is a co-editor of the International Journal of Central Banking, an associate editor at the Journal of Financial Intermediation, and an associate editor Journal of Financial Services Research.

Research 
Her research mainly focuses on international macroeconomics, international banking and Finance and the International Role of the Dollar. Her works received more than 21000 citations and she is the 574th most cited economist in the world according to IDEAS. She has published in the Journal of International Economics, Review of Economics and Statistics, and has numerous NBER working papers with over 500 citations. Her research has been quoted by Reuters, Slate, and Bilan.

Selected bibliography 

 Goldberg, Linda S.; Tille, Cédric (2008-12-01). "Vehicle currency use in international trade". Journal of International Economics. 76 (2): 177–192.
 Campa, José Manuel; Goldberg, Linda S. (2005-11-01). "Exchange Rate Pass-Through into Import Prices". The Review of Economics and Statistics. 87 (4): 679–690.
 Campa, Jose; Goldberg, Linda S (1997-02). "The Evolving External Orientation of Manufacturing Industries: Evidence from Four Countries", NBER working paper.

References 

Year of birth missing (living people)
Living people
American women economists
21st-century American economists
20th-century American economists
Princeton University alumni
City University of New York alumni
20th-century American women
21st-century American women